Arnošt Kreuz (or Ernst Kreuz, 9 May 1912 – 9 February 1974), was a Czech football forward of German ethnicity who played for Czechoslovakia in the 1938 FIFA World Cup.

FIFA World Cup Career

References

External links
 
 FIFA profile

Czech footballers
Czechoslovak footballers
Czechoslovakia international footballers
Association football forwards
1938 FIFA World Cup players
1912 births
1974 deaths
Sudeten German people
Sportspeople from Ústí nad Labem
AC Sparta Prague players
DFC Prag players